Chantal Meek (born 19 December 1978 in Kent, England) is an English-born Australian sprint canoeist and marathon canoeist who has competed since the mid-2000s. Competing in two Summer Olympics, she won a bronze medal in the K-4 500 m event at Beijing in 2008.

Meek also won a bronze medal in the K-4 1000 m event at the 2003 ICF Canoe Sprint World Championships in Gainesville.
Chantal married Mark Minchin in 2008 and is now Chantal Minchin.

References
Australian Olympic Committee profile

Sports-reference.com profile

1978 births
Australian female canoeists
English emigrants to Australia
Canoeists at the 2004 Summer Olympics
Canoeists at the 2008 Summer Olympics
Living people
Olympic canoeists of Australia
Olympic bronze medalists for Australia
Olympic medalists in canoeing
ICF Canoe Sprint World Championships medalists in kayak
Medalists at the 2008 Summer Olympics